The American Personal Responsibility in Food Consumption Act, also known as the Cheeseburger Bill, sought to protect producers and retailers of foods—such as McDonald's Corporation—from an increasing number of suits and class action suits by obese consumers. To date these suits have been turned down by the courts, sometimes in strong terms. The Act never became a law.

The Act was passed by the U.S. House of Representatives in March 2005, and did receive a Senate vote. The Act states that food-producing or retailing corporations cannot be legally held responsible for obesity, heart disease, or other health-related issues caused by consumption of their food, save for situations where actual food quality or handling was held responsible for such issues.

The bill was reintroduced in 2005 by Florida Republican Congressman Ric Keller. Keller had taken the maximum level of PAC donations up to $300,000 for his personal campaign funding from restaurants including McDonald's, Wendy's, and Burger King. On October 19, 2005, it once again passed the House with a 306–120 vote although Keller actually missed the vote due to being rushed to the hospital after suffering a cardiac arrhythmia. Once again, it failed to achieve a Senate vote.

Many state legislatures have considered their own versions of the bill.

References

External links
Article Center for Consumer Freedom
Prof. John F. Banzhaf III's obesity activism homepage
BBC News Online: US approves 'Cheeseburger bill'

United States proposed federal health legislation
Food law
Proposed legislation of the 108th United States Congress
Proposed legislation of the 109th United States Congress